Javier Fesser Pérez de Petinto (Madrid, born 15 February 1964) is a Spanish film director and publicist. He is a multiple Goya Award winner for his films Camino and Mortadelo y Filemón contra Jimmy el Cachondo, and an Academy Award nominee for his film Binta and the Great Idea.

Fesser earned his degree in Communication studies at the Universidad Complutense de Madrid.  He was the founder of Línea Films in 1986.

His brother  Guillermo Fesser is a famous journalist.

Filmography

Film

Short film

Bibliography
Tres Días en el Valle: Mi (In)experiencia Benedictina (2005)
Los Días de Colores (2011)

Awards 
 2007 Academy Award for Live Action Short Film (Nomination)
 2008 Goya Award for Best Director
 2009 Goya Award for Best Original Screenplay

See also
 List of Spanish Academy Award winners and nominees

External links 
 

1964 births
Living people
Film directors from Madrid
Best Director Goya Award winners
Complutense University of Madrid alumni
20th-century Spanish screenwriters
20th-century Spanish male writers
21st-century Spanish screenwriters